José Vilar may refer to:

José de Nouvilas de Vilar (1843–1913), Spanish Puerto Rican soldier and politician
José Miguel Vilar-Bou (born 1979), Spanish science-fiction and horror writer, and journalist